Ellis Pond, also known as Silver Lake and Roxbury Pond, is a  glacial lake in Roxbury, Maine and partially in Byron, Maine, United States. It contains two islands, the bigger being named French Island, and the smaller unnamed. It also contains three small islets, the biggest of which is informally referred to as Loony Island, due to loons nesting there. It is fed by the  Garland Brook and various smaller, unnamed streams, brooks, and rivers, and is drained by Ellis River.

In 1940, the pond was estimated to be  in size, and in 1869, it was estimated to be   in size.

References

Further reading
 "Dixfield man builds fishing shack with tractor-trailer cab". Sun Journal. February 16, 2015.

Lakes of Oxford County, Maine